, also known as Kōko Yoshitsuya (甲胡　芳艶) and as Ichieisai Yoshitsuya (一英斎　芳艶), was a Japanese designer of ukiyo-e woodblock prints.

Yoshitsuya was a student of Utagawa Kuniyoshi and, like his teacher, is best known for his woodblock prints of warriors. Yoshitsuya also produced many advertisements and designs for tattoos.

Yoshitsuya's students include Utagawa Kazutoyo (active c. 1862–70), Utagawa Yoshitoyo II (active c. 1862–77) and Yoshitsuya II (active c. 1870s).

Gallery

References
 Lane, Richard. (1978).  Images from the Floating World, The Japanese Print. Oxford: Oxford University Press. ;  OCLC 5246796
 Newland, Amy Reigle. (2005). Hotei Encyclopedia of Japanese Woodblock Prints.  Amsterdam: Hotei. ;  OCLC 61666175 
 Roberts, Laurance P. (1976). A Dictionary of Japanese Artists. New York: Weatherhill. ;  OCLC 2005932 

1822 births
1866 deaths
Yoshitsuya